Al Buraimi Governorate is one of the 11 governorates of Oman. Until October 2006, the area was part of Ad Dhahirah Region. At this time, the new governorate was created from the Wilayats (Provinces) of Al Buraymi and Mahdah. A third wilayat, As-Sunaynah, was created from parts of the two. Sayyid Saud bin Hilal bin Hamad al-Busaidi has been governor since 2020.

The town of Al-Buraimi is an oasis town in northwestern Oman, on the border of the United Arab Emirates. Al Ain is an adjacent city on the UAE side of the border. Both settlements are part of the historical region of Tawam or Al-Buraimi Oasis. For many decades, there had been an open border between Al-Buraimi located in Oman and Al-Ain. The traditional border near Al-Ain City is now closed to all except to those with valid visas (GCC nationals require no visa).

Climate
Al Buraimi has a hot desert climate (Köppen climate classification: BWh).

Demographics

Transportation
Transport in and around Al-Buraimi is by taxis, which like the majority of taxis in Oman are coloured orange and white. Drivers accept payment in both Omani Riyals and United Arab Emirates Dirhams, a trip within the township of Al-Buraimi will generally cost no more than 5 AED/0.5 OMR to 1.5 OMR. A trip to Mahdha may cost over 50 AED / 5 to 10 OMR.

Buraimi lies on a bus route from Dubai to Muscat.

Culture

Al-Buraimi, like the rest of Oman, features many historic forts in varying condition. The largest mosque in Al-Buraimi is the Sultan Qaboos Grand Mosque, named after the Sultan, Qaboos bin Said al Said. There are ruins of ancient hovels and a fort in Al-Buraimi.

History and prehistory

Being in the region of the Western Hajar, the area of Al-Buraimi and Al-Ain, traditionally referred to as 'Tawam', is of historical and cultural importance. It is demonstrated to have been inhabited as far back as the Hafit period of the early Bronze Age, and according to one author, an oasis in this region and Al-Hasa in Saudi Arabia are the most important in the Arabian Peninsula.

Al-Buraimi was part of Oman from early historical times. From around 600 CE, the Azdi tribes of Oman occupied the area. Then Al-Buraimi town was abandoned in the 700s. The area witnessed events relevant to the history of Islam during the Rashidun, Umayyad and Abbasid eras. The area had come under the rule of the Wajihid Dynasty in the 9th century CE. Al Nuaimi tribe, the original people of the town, rebuilt and ruled it in the 1800s to the 1950s. It had only two rulers, Sheikh Sulṭan bin Mohamed bin Ali Al-Hamood Al Qurtasi Al Naimi, then Sheikh Saqer bin Sulṭan bin Moḥammed Al Hamood Al Qurtasi Al Naimi. The late president of the United Arab Emirates, Sheikh Zayed bin Sultan Al Nahyan, was known to have been brought from Abu Dhabi to Al-Ain by his mother, Shaikhah Salaamah, following the assassination of his father Sultan bin Zayed in 1927. Zayed was raised in a fortified house in the Muwaiji district of Al-Ain. Since 1761, Abu Dhabi was ruled by sheikhs of Al Abu Falah dynasty.

The Buraimi Dispute

The community of Al-Buraimi is probably best known as the result of an incident known as the "Buraimi Dispute." The dispute arose from Saudi Arabia's claim, first made in 1949, of sovereignty over a large part of Abu Dhabi territory where oil was suspected to be present and an area in a  circle around the centre of the Buraimi Oasis. The Saudis relied on historical precedent (the oasis was under Wahhabi influence in the period between 1800 and 1870) for their claims, which were countered by arguments from Abu Dhabi and Muscat based on more recent events. 

The argument led to the 1950 London Agreement, whereby exploration and troop movements in the area would continue until the issue of sovereignty was resolved. Despite ongoing negotiations, the Saudis attempted to take back the oasis. In 1952 a group of some 80 Saudi Arabian guards, 40 of whom were armed, led by the Saudi Emir of Ras Tanura, Turki Abdullah Al Otaishan, crossed Abu Dhabi territory and occupied Hamasa, one of three Omani villages in the oasis, claiming it as part of the eastern Province of Saudi Arabia. The Sulṭan of Muscat and Imam of Oman gathered his forces to expel the Saudis but was persuaded by the British government to exercise restraint pending attempts to settle the dispute by arbitration.

A standstill agreement was implemented and, on 30 July 1954, it was agreed to refer the dispute to an international arbitration tribunal. Meanwhile, Saudi Arabia embarked on a campaign of bribery to obtain declarations of tribal loyalty on which its case was based. In 1955 arbitration proceedings began in Geneva only to collapse when the British arbitrator, Sir Reader Bullard, withdrew. A few weeks later, the Saudi party was forcibly ejected from Hamasa by the Trucial Oman Levies, a paramilitary group raised by the British. Together with a few refugee sheikhs and their families, the Saudis were taken to Sharjah and dispatched to Saudi Arabia by sea. The dispute was finally settled in 1974 by an agreement, known as the Treaty of Jeddah, between Sheikh Zayed (then President of the UAE) and King Faisal of Saudi Arabia.

See also
Eastern Arabia
Al Qabil, village in Al Buraimi Governorate
Archaeological Sites of Bat, Al-Khutm and Al-Ayn
Jebel Ghawil
University of Buraimi

References

External links
 World66 Buraimi World
 Bulletin

 
Oases of Oman
Oman–United Arab Emirates border crossings
States and territories established in 2006
Governorates of Oman